Various lesbian flags have been used to symbolise the lesbian community. Since 1999, many designs have been proposed and used. Although personal preferences exist, as well as various controversies, no design has been widely accepted by the community as the lesbian flag.

History 

 

The labrys lesbian flag was created in 1999 by graphic designer Sean Campbell, and published in June 2000 in the Palm Springs edition of the Gay and Lesbian Times Pride issue. The design involves a labrys, a type of double-headed axe, superimposed on the inverted black triangle, set against a violet background. Among its functions, the labrys was associated as a weapon used by the Amazons of mythology. In the 1970s it was adopted as a symbol of empowerment by the lesbian feminist community. Women considered asocial by Nazi Germany for not conforming to the Nazi ideal of a woman, which included homosexual females, were condemned to concentration camps and wore an inverted black triangle badge to identify them. Some lesbians reclaimed this symbol as gay men reclaimed the pink triangle (many lesbians also reclaimed the pink triangle although lesbians were not included in Paragraph 175 of the German criminal code). The color violet became associated with lesbians via the poetry of Sappho.

The lipstick lesbian flag was introduced in 2010 in the weblog This Lesbian Life. The design contains a red kiss in the left corner, superimposed on seven stripes consisting of six shades of red and pink colors and a white bar in the center. The lipstick lesbian flag represents "homosexual women who have a more feminine gender expression", however it has not been widely adopted. Some lesbians have argued that the lipstick flag is butch-phobic, while others oppose its use due to controversial comments made by the flag's designer on her blog.

The "pink" lesbian flag was derived from the lipstick lesbian flag but with the kiss mark removed. The pink flag attracted more use as a general lesbian pride flag.

The "orange-pink" lesbian flag, modeled after the seven-band pink flag, was introduced on Tumblr by blogger Emily Gwen in 2018. The colors include dark orange for "gender non-conformity", orange for "independence", light orange for "community", white for "unique relationships to womanhood", pink for "serenity and peace", dusty pink for "love and sex", and dark rose for "femininity". A five-stripes version was soon derived from the 2018 colors.

Gallery

Flags at events

See also
 LGBT symbols

References

Flags introduced in 1999
Flags introduced in 2010
Flags introduced in 2016
Flags introduced in 2018
LGBT flags
LGBT-related controversies in art
Sexuality flags